Maura Haponski (born August 27, 1957) is an American luger. She competed in the women's singles event at the 1976 Winter Olympics.

References

1957 births
Living people
American female lugers
Olympic lugers of the United States
Lugers at the 1976 Winter Olympics
People from Killeen, Texas